The rufous-sided broadbill (Smithornis rufolateralis) is a species of bird in the family Calyptomenidae.

It is sparsely distributed throughout the intra-tropical rainforest of Sub-Saharan Africa.

Its natural habitat is subtropical or tropical moist lowland forests.

References

rufous-sided broadbill
Birds of the African tropical rainforest
rufous-sided broadbill
rufous-sided broadbill
Taxonomy articles created by Polbot